Subair Muritala Ali (born in Nigeria) is a Nigerian football player. Muritala earlier played for Mahindra United and Chirag United.

References

External links
 https://archive.today/20110105101948/http://mohunbaganac.com/SEPT08/news_details.php?newsid=720

Nigerian footballers
Living people
Expatriate footballers in India
Nigerian expatriate sportspeople in India
1991 births
Sportspeople from Lagos
Association football forwards
Calcutta Football League players